The mixed team tournament of the 2007 European Junior Badminton Championships was held from 31 March to 3 April 2007.

Seeds

Group stage

Group A 

Denmark vs. Turkey

France vs. Scotland

Denmark vs. Scotland

France vs. Turkey

Denmark vs. France

Scotland vs. Turkey

Group B 

Russia vs. Switzerland

Bulgaria vs. Czech Republic

Russia vs. Czech Republic

Bulgaria vs. Switzerland

Russia vs. Bulgaria

Czech Republic vs. Switzerland

Group C 

Germany vs. Estonia

England vs. Ukraine

Germany vs. Ukraine

England vs. Estonia

Germany vs. England

Ukraine vs. Estonia

Group D 

Netherlands vs. Poland

Sweden vs. Portugal

Netherlands vs. Portugal

Sweden vs. Poland

Netherlands vs. Sweden

Portugal vs. Poland

Knockout stage

Top 4 

Denmark vs. England

Netherlands vs. Russia

Denmark vs. Russia

England vs. Netherlands

5th – 8th place 

Germany vs. Czech Republic

Scotland vs. Poland

Germany vs. Scotland

Czech Republic vs. Poland

9th – 12th place 

Ukraine vs. Sweden

France vs. Bulgaria

Ukraine vs. France

Sweden vs. Bulgaria

13th – 16th place 

Switzerland vs. Estonia

Turkey vs. Portugal

Switzerland vs. Turkey

Estonia vs. Portugal

Ranking

References 

2007 European Junior Badminton Championships